Hélène de Montferrand (born 1947 Saint-Mandé) is a French novelist.

She grew up in Algeria and studied at Nanterre and at the Sorbonne. Her work continues and "resonates with echoes" the work of Jeanne Galzy. She received the Goncourt prize for a first novel (not to be mistaken with the Prix Goncourt) in 1990 for Les amies d'Héloïse.  The novel is an exchange of letters. She contributes regularly to the Lesbia magazine.

Works 
 Sonate royale, poèmes, Paris, les Paragraphes littéraires de Paris, 1970
 Les Amies d'Héloïse, roman, Ed. de Fallois, Paris, 1990
 Journal de Suzanne, roman, Ed. de Fallois, Paris, 1991, 
 Les Enfants d'Héloïse, Double interligne, Paris, 1997 ; la Cerisaie, Paris, 2002
 Avec Elula Perrin, L'Habit ne fait pas la nonne, Paris, Double interligne, 1998
 Avec Elula Perrin, Ne tirez pas sur la violoniste, Paris, Double interligne, 1999
 Retour à Sarcelles, roman des temps prolétariens, Paris, la Cerisaie : 2004

References

People from Saint-Mandé
1947 births
Living people
20th-century French novelists
21st-century French novelists
Prix Goncourt du Premier Roman recipients
21st-century French women writers
20th-century French women writers